Matui may refer to:
 Matui, Chaharmahal and Bakhtiari (متويي)
 Matui, Khuzestan (مطويي)